Andrei Sava (born 7 May 1991) is a Romanian professional footballer who plays as a defender for Metaloglobus București. Sava made his Liga I debut on 20 February 2015 for Viitorul Constanța in a 0-3 defeat against Politehnica Iași. He also played in the Liga II for several teams: Progresul București, Știința Bacău, Otopeni, ACU Arad, Politehnica Timișoara or Juventus București and at Liga III for: Progresul Cernica and Viitorul Axintele.

International career
Andrei Sava played in 6 matches for Romania U-19.

Honours

Metaloglobus București
Liga III: 2016–17

References

External links
 
 

1991 births
Living people
Footballers from Bucharest
Romanian footballers
Association football defenders
Romania youth international footballers
Liga I players
FC Viitorul Constanța players
Liga II players
FC Progresul București players
CS Otopeni players
CS ACU Arad players
FC Politehnica Timișoara players
ASC Daco-Getica București players
FC Metaloglobus București players